1969 – Siempre, En Vivo Desde Monterrey, Parte 1 is a live album released by Regional Mexican singer Jenni Rivera, released on December 3, 2013. It is Part 1 of a trilogy recorded live in her final concert in Monterrey, Nuevo León, Mexico, just three hours before her death.
The second part, 1969 – Siempre, En Vivo Desde Monterrey, Parte 2 was released on July 2, 2014 (what would have been Rivera's 45th birthday).

1969 – Siempre, En Vivo Desde Monterrey, Parte 1 reached number two on the Mexican Albums Chart and number one on the Billboard Top Latin Albums chart in the United States. It also reached number twenty-five on the Billboard 200 in 2013 and 2014. It also debuted at one on the Billboard Top Regional Mexican Albums.

1969 – Siempre, En Vivo Desde Monterrey, Parte 1 was certified platinum (Latin field) by the Recording Industry Association of America (RIAA) for shipments of 28,000 copies. In Mexico it was certified platinum by Asociación Mexicana de Productores de Fonogramas y Videogramas (AMPROFON) for shipment of 60,000 copies. It was nominated for Top Latin Album of the Year at the 2014 Billboard Music Awards.

Reviews 
"Recorded just hours before an airplane crash would take her life, 1969: Siempre: En Vivo Desde Monterrey, Pt.1 captures Jenni Rivera's last concert, a show in Monterrey, Mexico on December 3, 2013. The good news is that it is another outstanding and powerful concert from the banda and norteño singer, and one that's filled with hits and fan favorites, plus, it's a concert that goes from full-band norteño performances to a smaller and more intimate acoustic set. There's also a heartfelt intro from Rivera's daughter, Jacquelin Melina Campos, plus a bonus studio recording of "Amarga Navidad" tacked on the end as a desirable bonus. The bad news is that the recording quality of the acoustic portion of the show is not from the soundboard and comes off as a rough, audience-recorded bootleg, but Rivera's decision to record the concert came at the last minute, leaving sound engineers with little time to prepare. Regardless, the singer's die-hard fans will appreciate owning this fiery, passionate bit of history." Allmusic

Track listing

Disc 2

Charts

Weekly charts

Year-end charts

Sales and certifications

Awards and nominations

See also
List of number-one Billboard Latin Albums from the 2010s
Year-end best selling Regional Mexican Albums

References

2013 live albums
Jenni Rivera live albums
Fonovisa Records live albums
Spanish-language live albums
Jenni Rivera video albums
Fonovisa Records video albums